The Guilty Are Afraid is a 1957 thriller novel by British  writer James Hadley Chase. The novel is set against the background of a rich gangster ridden city on the American Pacific Coast where Lew Brandon, the protagonist, looks for the killer, the antagonist who disposed of his partner Jack Sheppey.

References

1957 British novels
Novels by James Hadley Chase
British thriller novels
Robert Hale books